Fumana arabica is a species of shrub in the family Cistaceae. They have a self-supporting growth form and simple, broad leaves and dry fruit. Individuals can grow to 22 cm tall.

Sources

References 

arabica
Flora of Malta